The 1966–67 Montenegrin Republic League was 22nd season of Montenegrin Republic League. Season started in August 1966 and finished in May 1967.

Season 

After the season 1965–66, Football Association of Montenegro decided to expand a number of participants from 10 to 12. So, the new members of Montenegrin Republic League became Mornar, Spuž and Čelik.
At the end of 22 weeks long competition, OFK Titograd won the title. Team from the capital were equalised with the second-placed Rudar, but they scored more goals during the season. With that result, OFK Titograd participated in the qualifiers for Yugoslav Second League.
After the autumn stage, Arsenal withdrawn from competition due to technical difficulties. Except them, from league was relegated 11th-placed Brskovo.

Table

Qualifiers for Yugoslav Second League 
Titograd played in the qualifiers for 1967–68 Second League – East. Their opponent was a winner of Republic League of SR Macedonia – Bregalnica Štip. Montenegrin team was eliminated.

Higher leagues 
On season 1966–67, three Montenegrin teams played in higher leagues of SFR Yugoslavia. Sutjeska participated in 1966–67 Yugoslav First League, while Budućnost and Lovćen played in 1966–67 Yugoslav Second League.

See also 
 Montenegrin Republic League
 Montenegrin Republic Cup (1947–2006)
 Montenegrin clubs in Yugoslav football competitions (1946–2006)
 Montenegrin Football Championship (1922–1940)

References 

Montenegrin Republic League